Kerguelenatica is a genus of predatory sea snails, marine gastropod mollusks in the family Naticidae, the moon snails.

Species
Species within the genus Kerguelenatica include:
 Kerguelenatica delicatula (E. A. Smith, 1902)
Species brought into synonymy
 Kerguelenatica bioperculata (Martens, 1878): synonym of Kerguelenatica delicatula (E. A. Smith, 1902)

References

 Torigoe K. & Inaba A. (2011). Revision on the classification of Recent Naticidae. Bulletin of the Nishinomiya Shell Museum. 7: 133 + 15 pp., 4 pls.

External links
 Powell A. W. B. (1951). Antarctic and Subantarctic Mollusca: Pelecypoda and Gastropoda. Discovery Reports, 26: 47-196, pl. 5-10

Naticidae
Monotypic gastropod genera